Finn Knutsen  (18 February 1932 – 14 February 2021) was a Norwegian politician.

Career
Knutsen was born in Langenes to Ole and Unni Knudsen. He was elected representative to the Storting for the period 1985–1989 for the Labour Party. He was a member of Øksnes municipal council from 1955 to 1987 (serving as mayor from 1967 to 1973) and 1991 to 1999 (again serving as mayor) and of Nordland county council from 1967 to 1979. He was awarded the King's Medal of Merit in 2000.

Knutsen died on 14 February 2021, four days short from his 89th birthday.

References

1932 births
2021 deaths
People from Øksnes
Labour Party (Norway) politicians
Members of the Storting
Mayors of places in Nordland
Recipients of the King's Medal of Merit
Place of death missing